Will You Be Ready? is an album by the American contemporary gospel music group Commissioned, released in 1988. The album was nominated for a Grammy. It won a GMA Dove Award.

The album peaked at number 6 on the US Billboard Top Gospel albums chart and number 22 on the Billboard Top Contemporary Christian chart.

Track listing
 "So Good to Know (The Savior)" – 4:41
 "Waiting to Hear from You" – 4:55
 "Don't Worry" – 4:42
 "Save Me Now" – 5:15
 "Will You Be Ready?" – 6:56
 "Lord Jesus Help Me (Help Somebody Else)" – 4:35
 "Let's Not Crucify Him Again" – 3:56
 "More Than You'll Ever Know" – 4:48
 "Take Your Burdens (To the Lord)" – 3:42
 "A Praise for You" – 5:39

Personnel
Fred Hammond: vocals, bass, drums
Keith Staten: vocals
Mitchell Jones: vocals
Karl Reid: vocals
Michael Brooks: keyboards, drum programming, synthesizer, Synclavier
Michael Williams: drums

Additional Musicians
Earl Wright, Jr.: keyboards
Randy Poole: Synclavier
Mario Resto: guitar
David McMurrary: saxophone
Eric Brice: guitar, keyboards
Parkes Stewart: background vocals
Byron Cage: background vocals

References

Commissioned (gospel group) albums
1988 albums